Bucculatrix callistricha is a moth in the family Bucculatricidae. It is found in North America, where it has been recorded from Ohio, Kentucky, Maine, Wisconsin and Quebec. It was first described by Annette Frances Braun in 1963.

The wingspan is about 7 mm. The forewings are dark brown, almost black, with brilliant silvery marks. The hindwings are dark fuscous, with a slight reddish tinge. Adults have been recorded on wing from April to May and from July to August.

The larvae feed on Corylus americana and Corylus cornuta. They mine the leaves of their host plant. The mine is slender and thread-like.

References

Natural History Museum Lepidoptera generic names catalog

Bucculatricidae
Moths described in 1963
Moths of North America
Taxa named by Annette Frances Braun